Shukuru is an album led by saxophonist Pharoah Sanders recorded in 1981 and released on the Theresa label in 1985.

Reception

In his review for AllMusic, Scott Yanow commented: "Sanders does a close impression of late-'50s John Coltrane on "Body and Soul" and "Too Young to Go Steady" and shows a bit more heat on the other two numbers. But fans of his most passionate dates are advised to get a sampling of the earlier Impulse recordings instead."

The authors of The Penguin Guide to Jazz Recordings stated that Sanders "appears to be rethinking his strategy... turning back to standards-playing for the first time in many years," and noted that "Body and Soul" is "intelligently performed, with few new ideas, but a sympathetic synthesis of much of what has gone on between Byas and Coltrane concentrated into a relatively straightforward melodic response."

Track listing
All compositions by Pharoah Sanders except as indicated
 "Shukuru" - 5:44 	
 "Body and Soul" (Frank Eyton, Johnny Green, Edward Heyman, Robert Sour) - 7:33 		
 "Mas in Brooklyn" - 3:41 		
 "Sun Song" (Leon Thomas) - 6:04 		
 "Too Young to Go Steady" (Harold Adamson, Jimmy McHugh) - 5:21 		
 "Jitu" - 5:43 		
 "For Big George" (Sanders, Thomas) - 7:59 Bonus track on CD reissue

Personnel
Pharoah Sanders - tenor saxophone, vocals
William Henderson - keyboards
Ray Drummond - bass
Idris Muhammad - drums
Leon Thomas - vocals (tracks 3 & 4)

References

1985 albums
Pharoah Sanders albums
Theresa Records albums